Cyperus dichrostachyus is a species of sedge that is native to parts of Africa.

See also 
 List of Cyperus species

References 

dichrostachyus
Plants described in 1850
Taxa named by Christian Ferdinand Friedrich Hochstetter
Flora of Madagascar
Flora of the Democratic Republic of the Congo
Flora of Zambia
Flora of Zimbabwe
Flora of Angola
Flora of Burundi
Flora of Cameroon
Flora of Eritrea
Flora of Ethiopia
Flora of Kenya
Flora of Malawi
Flora of Rwanda
Flora of Sudan
Flora of Tanzania
Flora of Uganda
Flora of South Africa